Pseudoruegeria haliotis is a Gram-negative, rod-shaped, aerobic and non-motile bacterium from the genus of Pseudoruegeria which has been isolated from the gut of an abalone (Haliotis discus hannai) from the coast of Jeju Island in Korea.

References 

Rhodobacteraceae
Bacteria described in 2013